Sussex Central High School is a senior high school in unincorporated Sussex County, Delaware, near Georgetown. It is a part of the Indian River School District (IRSD).

External links
 

Public high schools in Delaware
High schools in Sussex County, Delaware